The X Factor is a British television music competition to find new singing talent. The eighth series aired on ITV on 20 August 2011 and ended on 11 December 2011. Dermot O'Leary hosted the main show on ITV, while Caroline Flack and series 6 runner-up Olly Murs co-presented the spin-off show The Xtra Factor on ITV2. Louis Walsh returned to the judging panel and was joined by Gary Barlow, Kelly Rowland and Tulisa. Barlow, Rowland, Tulisa joined the panel replacing judges, Simon Cowell, Dannii Minogue and Cheryl Cole. Series 5 winner Alexandra Burke served as a guest judge for week 4 of the live shows due to Rowland having a throat infection.

Little Mix, a British four-piece girlgroup known earlier in the show as Rhythmix, was the first group to win the series. The group consisting of members Leigh-Anne Pinnock, Jesy Nelson, and Perrie Edwards, and Jade Thirlwall, all auditioned as solo artists before being put together as a group by the judges. They went on to become the first girl group to make it past week seven of the live shows, the first girl group to reach the finals and the first girl group to win the show. The eighth series also won Most Popular Talent Show at the 17th National Television Awards on 25 January 2012.

Judges, presenters and other personnel

On 5 May 2011, it was announced that Simon Cowell and Cheryl Cole would not return as judges for the eighth series to work on the first season of The X Factor USA. On 14 May 2011, Dannii Minogue announced that she would not be returning either, due to a clash with Australia's Got Talent, another show for which she judges. Of her decision, Minogue said, "During discussions for me to return to The X Factor it became clear that unfortunately, this year, The X Factor audition dates in the UK clash with the live shows of Australia's Got Talent during June and July. For this reason I am unable to return".

After Cowell and Cole announced their departures, a number of celebrities were linked to the judging role including Frankie Sandford, Alesha Dixon, Lily Allen, and Noel Gallagher. On 9 May 2011, five days before Minogue announced her departure, news broke that Cowell had offered a seat to Gary Barlow of Take That, though his contract was not finalised. Following Minogue's announcement, it was reported that Tulisa from N-Dubz had been in talks with producers to take on a judging role to replace Cole. It was also suggested that Kelly Rowland, formerly of Destiny's Child, was in discussions to take a seat on the judging panel for Minogue's replacement. Although Cole briefly served as a judge on the American panel, she was dropped from the American panel and Cowell gave her the option to return to the 2011 UK series judging panel. However, she later rejected his offer due to her unwillingness to judge the UK show without Cowell. On 30 May 2011, the judging line-up was confirmed as Louis Walsh, Barlow, Tulisa and Rowland. Barlow said that he was "extremely excited" to work on the show, and hoped to find a global superstar. Tulisa hoped to "bring something fresh and new to the panel", promising to speak her mind. Rowland wanted an "opportunity to hear a few diamonds in the rough" and said she would be "sternly honest". In week 4 of the live finals on 29 and 30 October, Rowland was unable to attend due to a throat infection and was replaced for these shows by Alexandra Burke, who won series 5.

In February 2011, Konnie Huq, who presented spin-off series The Xtra Factor for series 7, was told that her contract would not be renewed. Matt Edmondson, Sandford, Kimberley Walsh, and series 6 contestant Stacey Solomon were all rumoured to be in the running, but it was confirmed on 31 May 2011 that Caroline Flack would co-present The Xtra Factor with series 6 runner-up Olly Murs.

Selection process

Applications and auditions

The first appeal for applicants for series 8 was broadcast during series 7 on 11 December 2010. For the first time, contestants could upload a video to YouTube. Auditions in front of the judges for series 8 took place in Cardiff, London, Glasgow, Liverpool, Birmingham and Manchester. It was the first time auditions had taken place in Liverpool, and the city replaced Dublin, where auditions were held in 2010.

The auditions started in Birmingham's LG Arena on 1 and 2 June. They then took place in Glasgow's SEC Centre on 6 June and continued in Manchester's Event City on 12, 13 and 14 June. More auditions took place at Cardiff's International Arena on 29 June, and at London's O2 on 6, 7 and 8 July, and finished in Liverpool's Echo Arena on 13 and 14 July. The Manchester auditions were postponed from 18 to 20 May.

London and Birmingham auditions were broadcast during the first episode on 20 August 2011. More of the London auditions, as well as the Liverpool and Manchester auditions, aired on 27 August 2011. On 3 September, the Glasgow auditions and more from London were shown. More auditions from Manchester, Birmingham and London were broadcast during the 10 September episode. More from London, plus the Manchester and Glasgow auditions were broadcast in the 11 September episode. The 17 September episode showed more auditions from Liverpool, Cardiff, London, Glasgow and Manchester. The final auditions aired on 18 September, and featured auditions from Liverpool, London and Cardiff.

Bootcamp
Bootcamp started on 18 August 2011. The first episode of bootcamp was broadcast on 24 September 2011. It showed 191 acts attending a pre-bootcamp party at The Selsdon Park Hotel in Croydon, while the judges reviewed their auditions to see if there were some acts they wanted to cut before bootcamp started. They cut 39 acts, leaving 152. The acts were split into 30 groups in which to perform at Wembley Arena, and each group was given one of six songs by the judges: "You've Got the Love", "Breakeven", "Price Tag", "Born This Way", "Forget You" or "Firework". The judges then went on to cut over 80 acts, but called back some soloists, who were asked if they were interested in forming groups. All agreed and were workshopped to see which singers would work well together. They formed six groups: Nu Vibe, Faux Pas, The Lovettes, The Risk, Misfits and Orion. The 61 remaining acts were then given the task of learning one song, 'making it their own' and performing it in front of a live audience, the second time bootcamp was open to an audience (the first was in 2009). The judges then chose the final 32 acts, based on these performances. However, they chose only 31 acts, including three of the new groups, and the final group, four-piece girl group Rhythmix, was made from two members each from Faux Pas and Orion.

Judges' houses
Judges' houses, the final part of the selection process, was filmed in September. Judges were given their categories in late August. Barlow mentored the Boys, Rowland the Girls, Walsh the Over 25s, and Tulisa the Groups. Robbie Williams joined Barlow in Los Angeles, Jennifer Hudson assisted Rowland in Miami, Walsh was accompanied by Sinitta in Barcelona, and Tulisa received help from Jessie J in Mykonos. At judges' houses each act performed two songs for their mentor and his/her guest judge, although only one song was mentioned and shown on the main show, with the other song shown on The Xtra Factor instead.

Sian Phillips was originally selected for the judges' houses, but due to visa issues, she was unable to travel to Miami and was thus replaced by Sarah Watson in the Girls category.

 Judges Houses Performances 
Act in bold advanced 
Groups:
 The Keys: "Best Thing I Never Had"
 The Estrelles:  "Love the Way You Lie"
 Girl v Boy: "Use Somebody"
 The Lovettes:"Forever Is Over"
 The Risk: "No Air"
 2 Shoes: "Tik Tok"
 Nu Vibe: "Written in the Stars"
 Rythmix: "Big Girls Don't Cry"

Girls:
 Amelia: "E.T."
 Jade: "I Can't Make You Love Me"
 Sophie: "He Won't Go"
 Sarah: "Knock You Down"
 Melanie: "Grenade"
 Holly: "For the First Time"
 Misha: "Fly"
 Janet: "Beautiful"

Over 25s
 Johnny: "Love Is a Losing Game"
 Sami: "Empire State of Mind (Part II) Broken Down"
 Terry: "Handbags & Gladrags"
 Carolynne: "Need You Now"
 Joseph: "Just the Way You Are"
 Goldie: "On the Floor"
 Jonjo: "Don't You Remember?"
 Kitty: "Beautiful Disaster"

Boys:
 Frankie: "What's My Name?"
 John: "Promise This"
 Joe: "Knockin' on Heaven's Door"
 James: "Skinny Love"
 Max: "The Only Exception"
 Luke: "Impossible"
 Marcus: "One Big Family"
 Craig: "Halo"
 
{| class="wikitable plainrowheaders"
|+Summary of judges' houses
|-
! Judge
! Category
! Location
! Assistant
! Acts Eliminated
|-
!scope="row"| Gary Barlow
| Boys
| Los Angeles
| Robbie Williams
| Joe Cox, Luke Lucas, Max Vickers, John Wilding
|-
!scope="row"| Tulisa
| Groups
| Mykonos
| Jessie J
| Girl v Boy, The Estrelles, The Keys, The Lovettes
|-
!scope="row"| Kelly Rowland
| Girls

| Miami
| Jennifer Hudson
| Melanie McCabe, Holly Repton, Jade Richards, Sarah Watson
|-
!scope="row"| Louis Walsh
| Over 25s
| Barcelona
| Sinitta
| Sami Brookes, Joseph Gilligan, Carolynne Poole, Terry Winstanley
|}
Tulisa appeared to eliminate both The Risk and The Keys at the end of the judges' houses stage, only to later call back three members of The Risk and one member of The Keys to form a new supergroup under the former group's name.

Goldie Cheung was initially put through to the finals by Walsh, but pulled out of the competition at the end of the judges' houses stage, stating that she did not want to be away from her family. Sami Brookes, who had initially not made it through, took her place in the live shows.

Acts 

Key:
 – Winner
 – Runner-Up
 – Ejected

Live shows
The live shows began on 8 October. Each week, the contestants' performances took place on Saturday and the results were announced on Sunday. As with previous series, each live show had a different theme. The results show often featured a group performance by the remaining contestants and guest live performances.

The first live results show included live performances from series 7 winner Matt Cardle and Cee Lo Green, while Katy Perry and The Wanted performed on the second results show. On the third results show, Bruno Mars, Professor Green featuring Emeli Sandé and Kelly Clarkson performed. Series 7 contestant Cher Lloyd and The X Factor USA judge Nicole Scherzinger performed on the fourth live result show. Series 5 runners up JLS and Florence and the Machine performed on the fifth live results show, while Lady Gaga and series 7 contestants One Direction performed on the sixth. The seventh live show featured performances from Rihanna and series 7 runner-up Rebecca Ferguson,. The eighth live results show included performances from former contestant and The Xtra Factor host Olly Murs featuring The Muppets, and Jessie J. JLS and One Direction also appeared alongside the 16 finalists to perform this year's charity single, "Wishing on a Star". The semi-final live result show featured performances from Justin Bieber and The X Factor judge Rowland. The live final featured performances from Coldplay, JLS, Leona Lewis, Michael Bublé and One Direction

For the live finals, The X Factor received new graphics and theme music similar to those already introduced on The X Factor USA. Voting by text message, which had been absent since 2007, was reintroduced for this series in addition to the premium rate telephone vote, but was not available during the final.

During the fourth week of the live shows, it was announced that Rowland was unable to travel back from Los Angeles due to a throat infection. During the week, it was announced that Burke would replace her as a judge on the show. After Burke accepted the role as guest judge, she became the first X Factor contestant to return to the show as a judge. It was reported on 28 June 2011 that the final would take place on 10 and 11 December 2011 at Wembley Arena instead of the usual Fountain Studios.

On 26 October 2011, Rhythmix announced that they would change their name due to pressure from a children's music charity of the same name, after the programme tried to trademark "Rhythmix" in Europe. It was reported that the group decided to make the change, despite no legal reason to do so, to avoid any difficulties for the charity. The name was subsequently changed to Little Mix.

On 28 October 2011, Ashley Baptiste decided to leave The Risk. In an interview on the official website, he explained "I don't believe my future lies in a boyband and it's not fair on [the other members] Charlie, Derry and Andy to remain in the band when I am not truly committed to it for the long term. I believe The Risk can win The X Factor and I'm backing them all the way. I count them as my friends so I know we'll stay in touch." He was replaced by Ashford Campbell, who was a member of Nu Vibe, another manufactured boyband who had already previously been eliminated.

On 8 November 2011, Frankie Cocozza was ejected from the competition, saying he "no longer [deserved his] place in the show", having broken competition rules. As a result, it was announced that the four contestants eliminated by their mentors in week 1; 2 Shoes, Amelia Lily, James Michael and Jonjo Kerr; would be given the chance to face a public vote, with the winner of the vote being reinstated in the competition. Amelia Lily won the public vote with 48% of the overall total and replaced Cocozza in the competition.

Results summary
Colour key
 Act in team Kelly

 Act in team Gary

 Act in team Tulisa

 Act in team Louis

 There was no public vote in the first week and no final showdown. Each judge was required to eliminate one of their own acts.
 Rowland was not present due to illness but voted via telephone link from Los Angeles.
 Barlow was not required to vote as there was already a majority. However, he stated that he would have voted to eliminate Sophie Habibis in week 4, Johnny Robinson in week 5 and Janet Devlin in the quarter-final.
 Following Frankie Cocozza's ejection from the competition, one of the four acts who were eliminated in the first week of the competition by the judges (2 Shoes, Amelia Lily, James Michael, or Jonjo Kerr) were given the chance to return to and replace Cocozza in the competition through a public vote. The winner of the public vote was Amelia Lily with 48.8%.
 The voting percentages in the final for the Sunday Vote do not add up to 100%, owing to the freezing of votes. Amelia Lily received 8.9% of the final vote.

Live show details

Week 1 (8/9 October)
Theme: Songs by British and American artists (billed as "Britain vs. America")
Musical guests: Matt Cardle ("Run for Your Life") and Cee Lo Green ("Satisfied/Forget You")
Best bits songs: "Use Somebody" (Jonjo Kerr),"Fix You" (James Michael),"I’ll Stand by You" (2 Shoes) & "The Silence" (Amelia Lily)

There was no public vote in the first week. Instead, each of the judges selected one of their own acts to eliminate.

Judges' decisions to eliminate
 Walsh: Jonjo Kerr – said he was the weakest performer in his category.
 Barlow: James Michael – thought the other three boys gave better performances than Michael.
 Tulisa: 2 Shoes – the decision came down to 2 Shoes and Nu Vibe, and Tulisa decided that Nu Vibe had more potential to improve.
 Rowland: Amelia Lily – the decision came down to Amelia Lily and Sophie Habibis; while Rowland felt that Lily had more of a star quality, she conceded that Habibis had given the better performance.

Week 2 (15/16 October)
Theme: "Love and heartbreak"
Group performance: "Hello"
Musical guests: The Wanted ("Lightning") and Katy Perry ("The One That Got Away")
Best bits song: "Gold Forever"

 
Judges' votes to eliminate
 Barlow: Nu Vibe – gave no reason, though effectively backed his own act, Frankie Cocozza.
 Rowland: Nu Vibe – gave no reason.
 Tulisa: Frankie Cocozza – gave no reason, though effectively backed her own act, Nu Vibe.
 Walsh: Nu Vibe – backed the act he believed could improve the most despite criticizing both performances on Saturday.

Week 3 (22/23 October)
Theme: Rock
Musical guests: Kelly Clarkson ("Mr. Know It All"), Professor Green featuring Emeli Sandé ("Read All About It") and Bruno Mars ("Runaway Baby")
Best bits song: "One Moment in Time"

Judges' votes to eliminate
 Barlow: Sami Brookes – said that both acts were "unbelievable" in the final showdown, but felt that Brucknell was "more exciting" and Brookes was "a little bit dated", despite saying Brookes' voice is "undeniable".
 Rowland: Sami Brookes – gave no reason but later revealed on The Xtra Factor that Brucknell's entertainment was essential for the competition.
 Tulisa: Kitty Brucknell – thought Brookes had a better connection with her.
 Walsh: Sami Brookes – declined to send the result to deadlock and chose to go with his heart; later emphasizing on The Xtra Factor Brucknell's clear passion and commitment to being in the show and a recording artist.

However, voting statistics revealed that Brookes received more votes than Brucknell which meant that if Walsh sent the result to deadlock, Brookes would have been saved.

Week 4 (29/30 October)
Theme: Halloween
Group performance: "Bright Lights Bigger City"
Musical guests: Cher Lloyd ("With Ur Love") and Nicole Scherzinger ("Try with Me")
Best bits song: "I Will Be"

Rowland did not appear on the judging panel for week 4 due to illness, so series 5 winner Alexandra Burke took her place on the panel. However, Burke did not vote on the results show; instead, Rowland voted via telephone link from Los Angeles. Rhythmix's new name 'Little Mix' took effect from Week 4. Ashley Baptiste from The Risk quit the group and Ashford Campbell who was originally in Nu Vibe (eliminated Week 2) joined The Risk.

Judges' votes to eliminate
Walsh: Sophie Habibis – said that Misha B was a better performer.
Tulisa: Sophie Habibis – said she related more to Misha B as an artist.
Rowland: Sophie Habibis – felt that Misha B wanted to stay in the competition more than Habibis. Although Rowland was absent, she voted via telephone from Los Angeles.
Barlow was not required to vote since there was already a majority, but confirmed he would have eliminated Habibis.

However, voting statistics revealed that Habibis received more votes than Misha B which meant that if the result went to deadlock, Habibis would have been saved.

Week 5 (5/6 November)
Theme: Club classics
Group performance: "Price Tag"
Musical guests : JLS ("Take a Chance on Me") and Florence and the Machine ("Shake It Out")
Best bits songs: "Safe" (The Risk) & "Love Is a Losing Game" (Johnny Robinson)
Two acts were eliminated from the series fifth results show. The three acts with the fewest public votes were announced as the bottom three and then the act with the fewest votes was automatically eliminated. The remaining two acts then performed in the final showdown for the judges' votes.

Judges' votes to eliminate
Walsh: Johnny Robinson – said that Brucknell was more likely to succeed in the music industry.
Tulisa: Johnny Robinson – agreed with Walsh.
Rowland: Johnny Robinson – also agreed with Walsh, and added that she felt Brucknell would "provide" the show with who she wanted to be as an artist.
Barlow was not required to vote since there was already a majority, but confirmed he would have eliminated Robinson.

However, voting statistics revealed that Robinson received more votes than Brucknell which meant that if the result went to deadlock, Robinson would have been saved.

Week 6 (12/13 November)
Theme: Songs by Lady Gaga or Queen (billed as "Lady Gaga vs. Queen")
Group performance: "Walking on Sunshine"
Musical guests: One Direction ("Gotta Be You") and Lady Gaga ("Marry the Night")
Best bits song: "Perfect"

On 8 November 2011, Frankie Cocozza was ejected from the competition. The four acts that did not face the public vote in week 1 and were eliminated by their mentors—Amelia Lily, James Michael, Jonjo Kerr, and 2 Shoes—faced the public vote and the act with the most votes would replace Cocozza. The winner of the vote was announced as Amelia Lily with 48.8% of the public vote.

Judges' votes to eliminate
Walsh: Misha B – gave no reason but effectively backed his own act, Kitty Brucknell.
Tulisa: Kitty Brucknell – said that after the show she would buy Misha B's album.
Rowland: Kitty Brucknell – backed her own act, Misha B, who she felt had more potential in the competition.
Barlow: Kitty Brucknell – said that Misha B had more potential and he thought that Brucknell was not connecting with the audience since this was her third time in the bottom two despite praising both final showdown performances and stating how Misha B and Brucknell were the most committed contestants and wanted to stay in the competition the most of all the remaining acts.

However, voting statistics revealed that Brucknell received more votes than Misha B which meant that if the result went to deadlock, Brucknell would have been saved.

Week 7 (19/20 November)
Theme: Songs from films (billed as "movie week")
Group performance: "When You're Gone" (with Bryan Adams)
Musical guests: Rebecca Ferguson ("Nothing's Real but Love") and Rihanna ("We Found Love")
 Best Bits song: "Patience"

Judges' votes to eliminate
Barlow: Amelia Lily – backed his own act, Craig Colton, and said that Lily had "shouted her way" through the final showdown.
Rowland: Craig Colton – backed her own act, Amelia Lily, who she said properly sang her survival song.
Tulisa: Amelia Lily – said that Colton sang better in the sing off.
Walsh: Craig Colton – said Lily was "a worldwide ready-made pop star" and had more potential.

With both acts receiving two votes each, the result went to deadlock and reverted to the earlier public vote. Craig Colton was eliminated as the act with the fewest public votes.

Week 8: Quarter-Final (26/27 November)
Themes: Guilty pleasures; musical heroes
Group performance: "Wishing on a Star" (all finalists except Frankie Cocozza, along with JLS and One Direction)
Musical guests: Olly Murs and The Muppets ("Dance with Me Tonight") and Jessie J ("Who You Are")
 Best bits song: "Your Song"

Starting in the quarter-final, each act performed two songs with voting lines opening after the first round of performances.

Judges' votes to eliminate
Walsh: Janet Devlin – based on the performances across the quarter-final.
Tulisa: Janet Devlin – based on the performances across the quarter-final, and thought Misha B had more long-term potential.
Rowland abstained from voting as both her acts were in the bottom two, O'Leary warned Rowland this would mean Devlin would be eliminated by default as Walsh and Tulisa voted against her, but Rowland still declined to vote.
Barlow was not required to vote since there was already a majority, but confirmed he would have voted to eliminate Devlin.

However, voting statistics revealed that Devlin received more votes than Misha B which meant that if the result went to deadlock, Devlin would have advanced to the semi-final and Misha B would have been eliminated.

Week 9: Semi-Final (3/4 December)
Themes: Motown; "songs to get you to the final" (no theme)
Group performance: "Hold On"
Musical guests: Justin Bieber ("Mistletoe") and Kelly Rowland ("When Love Takes Over" / "Down for Whatever" / "Commander")
 Best bits song: "Set Fire to the Rain"

 
The semi-final did not feature a final showdown and instead the act with the fewest public votes, Misha B, was automatically eliminated. After her elimination, Misha B reprised her week 6 final showdown performance of "Who You Are" as her exit song.

Week 10: Final (10/11 December)
The final was held at Wembley Arena and lasted for over four hours, split over Saturday 10 and Sunday 11 December 2011.

10 December
Themes: No theme; mentor duets
Group performance: "Greatest Day"
Musical guests: JLS and One Direction ("She Makes Me Wanna" / "What Makes You Beautiful"), Michael Bublé ("Christmas (Baby Please Come Home)") and Leona Lewis ("Hurt")
 Best bits song: "Chances"

If Amelia Lily had made the final two, her favourite performance would have been, "The Show Must Go On" from week six, and would have sung "All I Want For Christmas Is You" for her Christmas song, as well as performing "Cannonball".

11 December
Themes: Favourite performance ("song of the series"); Christmas songs; winner's single
Group performance: "We Found Love" / "Party Rock Anthem" / "On the Floor" / "Moves Like Jagger" / "The Edge of Glory" (all contestants except Frankie Cocozza who was replaced by Goldie Cheung and David Wilder)
Musical guests: Westlife ("What About Now") and Coldplay ("Charlie Brown" and "Paradise")
 Best bits songs: "Rule the World" (Marcus Collins) & "I’ll Stand by You" (Little Mix)

Charity single
It was announced on 12 October 2011, that the 16 finalists would record a cover version of "Wishing on a Star", released on 20 November in aid of Together for Short Lives, a charity which Cowell said do "amazing work". It is the fourth time finalists have released a charity single. Series 5 contestants JLS and series 7 contestants One Direction also feature on the single.

Winner's single
The winner's single was Damien Rice's "Cannonball". For the first time since series 1, the winner's single was not released in the week of the coveted Christmas number one chart battle. The Official Charts Company announced that the 2011 Christmas number-one would be announced on Christmas Day, meaning releases on 18 December would be new entries in the chart that week. Little Mix's winner's single was released on 14 December, which meant it would have to maintain significant sales numbers in its second week to achieve the Christmas number one. It was announced on 17 November that N-Dubz rapper Fazer would be producing the single.

Marks and Spencer deal
In September 2011, it was announced that Marks & Spencer would be The X Factor official fashion partner. On 2 October 2011, it was revealed that the 16 finalists would star in the retailer's 2011 Christmas advertisement. It is a one-minute advertisement that premiered during week 5 of the live shows. The finalists recorded a cover of the song "When You Wish upon a Star" to feature in the advert and modelled clothes from the company. The finalists will be paid for the advertisement. After his ejection from the competition, M&S announced that Frankie Cocozza's face would be edited out of the advert, as it wasn't possible to edit his voice from the advert. On 17 November 2011, M&S posted the latest edit of the advert to their official YouTube account, with Cocozza's vocals completely erased.

Reception

Ratings
Initial viewing figures for the first episode were placed at 11.3 million for ITV1, however, the peak audience was 12.6 million, a match for the highest viewing figures for an X Factor series opener, and almost 5 million more than Doctor Who on BBC One, the second-highest rated programme that night.

Despite a drop in ratings from the previous series, it was the third most watched series in the show's eight-year history

 The ITV+1 rating for the Live Results show that was broadcast on 23 October 2011 is unavailable as it is outside the Top 10 ratings recorded on the BARB website. It had fewer than 0.20 million viewers.

 The ITV+1 rating for the Live Results show that was broadcast on 13 November 2011 is unavailable as it is outside the Top 10 ratings recorded on the BARB website. It had fewer than 0.19 million viewers.

Controversies

Allegation of bullying

Misha B was involved in a controversy during the third live show when Tulisa accused her of making "mean comments" and Walsh accused her of being a "bully" backstage. Both later apologised. The other two judges, Barlow and Rowland, and several contestants defended Misha B during and after the show, and Barlow stated in his 2018 autobiography A Better Me that he had refused to give into backstage producers' attempts to convince him and the other judges to stir up the bullying narrative against her to attract media coverage to the show. Barlow later said he believed the wrongful allegations had ended her chances of winning the competition. In June 2020, Misha B stated that as a result of the orchestrated racism she experienced at the hands of the producers, she suffered suicidal tendencies and was eventually diagnosed with PTSD.

Frankie Cocozza's ejection

On 8 November, Frankie Cocozza was ejected from the competition. He released a statement saying "I'd like to apologise to Gary, my fellow contestants and everyone who has voted for me, but, as of today, I will no longer be in The X Factor. My life during the show has gone out of control and my behaviour off stage has overstepped the rules of the competition."

The Sun newspaper claimed Cocozza had been overheard boasting about using cocaine.

Cocozza's behaviour earlier in the series has led to two Ofcom investigations – he swore during a live show and was also shown drinking heavily with some friends.

References

External links
 The X Factor

 08
2011 in British music
2011 British television seasons
United Kingdom 08